Benya is a surname of Slavic origin, being an Americanized form of several different surnames. Notable people with the surname include:

Anton Benya (1912-2001), Austrian politician and trade unionist
Mascha Benya (1908-2007), Russian-born soprano

See also
Benya Krik, a fictional character from The Odessa Tales
Benya Krik (film), a 1927 Soviet silent film
Benya Kipala, a town in Boulgou Province, Burkina Faso
Benya-Peulh, a village in Boulgou Province, Burkina Faso